United Junior/Senior High School may refer to:
United Senior High School (Illinois) — sometimes still labeled as "United Junior/Senior High School"
United Junior/Senior High School (Pennsylvania)

See also
 United High School (disambiguation) for schools with similar names